Oksana Luneva (born 2 August 1979) is a Kyrgyz sprinter who specialized in the 400 metres.

She competed at the Olympic Games in 2000 and 2004, but without reaching the final.

Her personal best time was 52.14 seconds, achieved in July 2004 in Bishkek.

References

External links
 

1979 births
Living people
Kyrgyzstani female sprinters
Athletes (track and field) at the 2000 Summer Olympics
Athletes (track and field) at the 2004 Summer Olympics
Olympic athletes of Kyrgyzstan
Olympic female sprinters
Kyrgyzstani people of Russian descent